Andinobates virolinensis (the Santander poison frog) is a species of frog in the family Dendrobatidae.
It is endemic to Colombia where it is confined to the Santander and Cundinamarca departments on the Cordillera Oriental.

Description

Habitat, life cycle, and diet
Andinobates virolinensis live on the floor of cloud forest. Females lay the eggs in leaf-litter, and the males bring the larvae to the bromeliads. Reproduction occurs throughout the year. The diet consists of various arthropods, including mites, springtails, ants, and insect larvae. Thus, their diet is broadly similar to other poison dart frogs.

Conservation
Andinobates virolinensis is considered "Vulnerable" by the IUCN because it is found in very few locations and because its habitat is threatened by habitat loss, primarily due to agricultural expansion. However, it is a common species in the zones it does inhabit.

Andinobates virolinensis is sometimes traded and sold as a pet, despite INDERENA Decree # 39 (July 1985) that forbade the collection of dendrobatids from the wild for breeding (or other) purposes.

References

Andinobates
Amphibians described in 1992
Amphibians of the Andes
Amphibians of Colombia
Endemic fauna of Colombia
Taxonomy articles created by Polbot